Joseph Stephen Pal (August 27, 1927 – October 13, 2012) was a Canadian football player with the Montreal Alouettes for nine seasons. Pal was a three time East All-Star at flying wing (1954, 1955, and 1956).

References

External links

1927 births
2012 deaths
Hamilton Tigers football players
Montreal Alouettes players
Sir George Williams University alumni
Canadian football slotbacks
Sportspeople from Hamilton, Ontario
Players of Canadian football from Ontario